Jarrod Zane Patterson (September 7, 1973 – March 11, 2020) was an American professional baseball third baseman. He was a graduate of Chilton County High School in Clanton, Alabama. He played during two seasons for Major League Baseball (MLB) for the Detroit Tigers and Kansas City Royals. He was drafted by the New York Mets in the 20th round of the 1993 MLB draft. Patterson played his first professional season with their Rookie League Gulf Coast Mets in 1993, and his last with the independent Northern League's Joliet Jackhammers, Schaumburg Flyers, Gary SouthShore RailCats in 2006. He played his last affiliated season for the Royals' Triple-A Omaha Royals in 2004.

Patterson died in an auto accident on March 11, 2020.

References

External links

Pelota Binaria

1973 births
2020 deaths
Águilas de Mexicali players
American expatriate baseball players in Mexico
American expatriate baseball players in Canada
Altoona Curve players
Baseball players from Montgomery, Alabama
Capital City Bombers players
Detroit Tigers players
Place of death missing
El Paso Diablos players
Erie SeaWolves players
Gary SouthShore RailCats players
Gulf Coast Mets players
High Desert Mavericks players
Jefferson Davis Warhawks baseball players
Joliet JackHammers players
Kansas City Royals players
Kingsport Mets players
Major League Baseball third basemen
Nashville Sounds players
Omaha Royals players
Ottawa Lynx players
Pastora de los Llanos players
People from Clanton, Alabama
Pittsfield Mets players
Regina Cyclones players
Road incident deaths in Alabama
Schaumburg Flyers players
St. Lucie Mets players
Toledo Mud Hens players
Tucson Sidewinders players
American expatriate baseball players in Venezuela